Elections to Oldham Council were held on 6 May 2010, on the same day as the UK General Election. One third of the council was up for election. The council remained in no overall control..

After the election, the composition of the council was

Labour 27
Liberal Democrat 27
Conservative 6

Election result

Ward results

Alexandra ward

Chadderton Central ward

Chadderton North ward

Chadderton South ward

Coldhurst ward

Crompton ward

Failsworth East ward

Failsworth West ward

Hollinwood ward

Medlock Vale ward

Royton North ward

Royton South ward

Saddleworth North ward

Saddleworth South ward

Saddleworth West and Lees ward

St James ward

St Marys ward

Shaw ward

Waterhead ward

Werneth ward

References
Oldham Council election, 2008 - nominations
Oldham councillors

2010 English local elections
May 2010 events in the United Kingdom
2010
2010s in Greater Manchester